Mohamed El-Naser is a Libyan swimmer. He competed in the men's 100 metre breaststroke at the 1980 Summer Olympics.

References

External links
 

Year of birth missing (living people)
Living people
Libyan male swimmers
Olympic swimmers of Libya
Swimmers at the 1980 Summer Olympics
Place of birth missing (living people)
Male breaststroke swimmers